Iran National Football Camp, also known as Performance Elite Center or (PEC), is an association football training facility in Tehran, Iran. Located in west of Azadi Sport Complex and operated by Iranian Football Federation, the camp is mostly used by Iran national football team.

The camp has a number of football fields, an indoor futsal pitch, a bodybuilding gym, classrooms, medical clinic, restaurant and dormitory.

The main building of "Iran Football Academy", which operates Iran youth football teams is located inside the complex.

References

External links 
 images
 News at FFIRI

Iran national football team
Iran National Football
Football venues in Iran
Sports venues in Tehran
Sports venues completed in 2000
2000 establishments in Iran
National football academies